The Albion-class ships of the line were a class of two-deck 90-gun second rates, designed for the Royal Navy by Sir William Symonds. Three more ships to this design were ordered in March 1840, but two of these ( and ) were re-ordered to fresh designs in 1847.

Ships

Builder: Plymouth Dockyard
Ordered: 18 March 1839
Launched: 6 September 1842
Fate: Broken up, 1884

Builder: Plymouth Dockyard
Ordered: 18 March 1839
Launched: 4 April 1848
Fate: Broken up, 1878

Builder: Plymouth Dockyard
Ordered: 12 March 1840
Launched: 12 July 1854
Fate: Broken up, 1905

References

Lavery, Brian (2003) The Ship of the Line - Volume 1: The development of the battlefleet 1650-1850. Conway Maritime Press. .
Lyon, David and Winfield, Rif (2004) The Sail and Steam Navy List, 1815-1889. Chatham Publishing. .

 
Ship of the line classes